Austin Samuels (born 20 November 2000) is an English professional footballer who plays for Inverness Caledonian Thistle, as a striker.

Club career
Samuels began his career with Wolverhampton Wanderers, joining them at the age of 8. He moved on loan to Kidderminster Harriers in January 2020, and on loan to Bradford City in October 2020. In November 2020 he was one of a number of young Bradford City players playing in the first team who were praised by manager Stuart McCall. He scored his first goal for the club, and his first professional goal, when he scored in a 7–0 FA Cup win over Tonbridge Angels on 7 November 2020. Later that month Samuels said that he was growing in confidence as he played more first-team matches. His loan ended early on 13 January 2021.

In August 2021 he moved on loan to Scottish club Aberdeen for the season. The loan ended early, in January 2022.

He signed for Inverness Caledonian Thistle in January 2022.

International career
Samuels was an England youth international.

Playing style
Samuels is known for his pace.

Career statistics

References

2000 births
Living people
Black British sportspeople
English footballers
England youth international footballers
Wolverhampton Wanderers F.C. players
Kidderminster Harriers F.C. players
Bradford City A.F.C. players
Aberdeen F.C. players
Inverness Caledonian Thistle F.C. players
National League (English football) players
English Football League players
Association football forwards
Scottish Professional Football League players